Maxine Deloris Jones is an American historian. She is a professor of history at Florida State University. Jones co-authored a book on African American history in Florida and another on Talladega College. She was the principal author of a report on the Rosewood Massacre for the Florida Legislature.

Jones completed her undergraduate, graduate, and doctoral studies at Florida State University. The book African Americans in Florida received an award from the Florida Historical Society in 1994.

Selected works
Rosewood Massacre report for the Florida Legislature, principal author

References

Living people
Year of birth missing (living people)
Place of birth missing (living people)
African-American historians
American women historians
21st-century American historians
20th-century American historians
Florida State University alumni
Florida State University faculty
African-American women academics
American women academics
African-American academics
20th-century American women
21st-century American women
African-American women writers